ITV Racing is a programme produced by ITV Sport for races shown on ITV or ITV4 in the United Kingdom. The programme is referred to as Racing on STV in Northern and Central Scotland on STV. In its previous incarnation, the show was an essential part of World of Sport.

History

1969-1985
It started on 4 October 1969 when the programme began to show horse racing from two courses each week rather than one, under the title "They're Off". In the early 1970s it changed to The ITV Seven, reflecting the number of races it showed each week. The ITV Seven was also the title of an accumulator bet where vast sums of money could be won if you correctly predicted the winners of all seven races.

The feature was sometimes known (especially in later years) as the ITV Six, the ITV Five or even the ITV Four, if fewer races were being shown. On these occasions, the bet would be on the remaining televised races and would be comparatively simpler to win, however it was still fairly difficult to win with, on just one bet.

The weekly live coverage came from racecourses such as Sandown Park, York, Newmarket, Doncaster, Newcastle and Redcar. More minor tracks like Warwick, Catterick and Market Rasen were also extensively featured, especially during the National Hunt season in the winter, when ITV had the rights to fewer of the big races.  Meetings from Goodwood and Haydock Park appeared occasionally, and a meeting from Ascot was shown as a one-off in 1977 when the BBC were covering the Grand National at Aintree. From January 1980 onwards, meetings from Kempton Park were shown regularly - before that time, Kempton meetings were on the BBC and were featured on Grandstand.

When racing was impossible due to the weather, greyhound racing would often be shown instead (those were the days before all-weather horse racing).

In the 1980s ITV reduced its racing coverage, and often in the last years of World of Sport only one meeting would be shown.  The last ITV Seven came from Kempton Park and Thirsk on 7 September 1985, three weeks before the last World of Sport, which only covered one meeting, at Redcar. ITV's midweek racing coverage had already been on Channel 4 since 22 March 1984; from 5 October 1985 the Saturday afternoon coverage also moved to the fourth channel, permanently becoming Channel 4 Racing, although it was reduced in scope considerably at the start of 1986, and would not become as extensive as it was in the ITV era until the late 1990s. For a few years ITV did continue to show The Derby, simulcasting Channel 4's coverage, but stopped doing so after the 1988 event.

2017-present
In January 2016, it was announced that ITV had regained horse racing rights from Channel 4 to take effect from 1 January 2017. 60 days of racing will be shown on ITV4, while 40 days of racing will be shown on ITV. ITV broadcasts big events such as the Grand National, Cheltenham Festival, Epsom Derby, Royal Ascot, Glorious Goodwood and British Champions Day, as well as regular Saturday meetings. ITV4 broadcasts The Opening Show, the morning preview programme similar to The Morning Line on Channel 4, and many other Saturday meetings, as well as the occasional weekday and Sunday meeting, at courses all over the UK and Ireland.

Presenters
Over the years, the live coverage was presented by John Rickman (until 1977), Brough Scott, Ken Butler, (until 1980) Lord Oaksey (initially known on the programme as John Lawrence, and subsequently becoming John Oaksey after he succeeded to the peerage), and Derek Thompson and Jim McGrath (from 1981-1985). Race commentators were Tony Cooke and Bob Haynes (in the first couple of years), John Penney and Raleigh Gilbert (the main commentators from 1972 to 1980) and Graham Goode (the main commentator from 1981).

On air team

References

External links
ITV Racing on itv.com
 
 

1969 British television series debuts
1985 British television series endings
2017 British television series debuts
1960s British sports television series
1970s British sports television series
1980s British sports television series
2010s British sports television series
2020s British sports television series
British television series revived after cancellation
English-language television shows
Horse racing mass media in the United Kingdom
ITV (TV network)
ITV Sport